Pitt Strait is a channel,  wide, separating Chatham Island and Pitt Island, the two largest islands in New Zealand's Chatham Islands.

References

Geography of the Chatham Islands
Straits of New Zealand
Chatham Island